English Brazilians are Brazilians of full, partial or predominantly English ancestry or English-born people residing in Brazil.

History

Colonial-era economic influences and the Anglo-Portuguese Alliance led to the settlement of English merchants and others in Brazil. After Brazilian independence, Britain was Brazil's main commercial partner; Britain financed part of the Brazil's industrialization, building railroads, including the São Paulo Railway (SPR).

In the 1920 Republican Census, there were 9,637 "Englishmen" in Brazil (probably, all British citizens were counted as "Englishmen"). The states with the majority of English origin were: 
 São Paulo (2,198),
 Federal District - which was the Rio de Janeiro city - (2,057),
 Minas Gerais (1,709), and
 Pernambuco (1,123). 
Brazilian cities settled by the English during the same period, include:
 Rio de Janeiro city (2,057),
 São Paulo (1,212),
 Recife (980),
 Santos (555), and
 Niterói (459).

Cultural influence
One of their major contributions at the cultural level was the establishment of several football clubs, including São Paulo Athletic Club and Fluminense Football Club.

Notable English Brazilians

James Norton Commander of the Brazilian Navy
Jorge Dodsworth Minister of the Navy
Fernando Abbott Governor of Rio Grande do Sul
Ronnie Biggs
Alice Dayrell Caldeira Brant
Bianca Byington
Oscar Cox
Alfie Enoch
John Pascoe Grenfell Admiral Brazilian Navy 
Tarsis Humphreys
Berta Lutz
Charles William Miller
Helena Morley
Gérard Moss
Ellen Gracie Northfleet
Eric Maleson - Olympic Bobsled Athlete
Marta Suplicy
Supla
Tim Vickery
Harry Welfare
José Roberto Wright
Andrucha Waddington

See also

 Brazil–United Kingdom relations
 Immigration to Brazil
 White Brazilians
 English people

References

 
 
European Brazilian